The 1992 Pacific hurricane season is the most active Pacific hurricane season on record, featuring 27 named storms, and the second-costliest Pacific hurricane season in history, behind the 2013 season. The season also produced the second-highest ACE value on record in the basin, only surpassed by the 2018 season. The season officially started on May 15 in the eastern Pacific, and on June 1 in the central Pacific, and lasted until November 30. These dates conventionally delimit the period of each year when most tropical cyclones form in the northeastern Pacific Ocean. However, these bounds were easily exceeded when Hurricane Ekeka formed on January 28 and again a couple months later with Tropical Storm Hali.

The most notable storm was Hurricane Iniki, which caused billions of dollars of damage to the Hawaiian Islands, primarily in Kauai, along with six casualties. Hurricanes Lester, Virgil, Winifred, and Orlene also made landfall and killed several people, but were significantly less destructive. Hurricane Darby and Tropical Storm Agatha brought rains and more destruction to Mexico, without making landfall. Hurricane Tina was, in addition to being the strongest storm of the year, the longest-lasting Pacific hurricane at the time.

Season summary 

The Accumulated Cyclone Energy (ACE) index for the 1992 Pacific hurricane season (Eastern Pacific and Central Pacific combined) as calculated by Colorado State University using data from the National Hurricane Center was 294.3 units, the second highest value on record for a Northeastern Pacific season.

The season officially started on May 15, 1992, in the Eastern Pacific, and on June 1, 1992, in the central Pacific, and lasted until November 30, 1992. These dates conventionally delimit the period of each year when most tropical cyclones form in the northeastern and north-central Pacific Ocean. However, the season wildly exceeded these bounds, as climatological effects including an El Niño caused Hurricane Ekeka to form on January 26. It is also the only known time that multiple cyclones had formed before the season began.

During the season, twenty-seven tropical cyclones formed in the Eastern Pacific (east of longitude 140°W), and twenty-four developed further and became tropical storms. Both of these figures constitute records in the basin, as the 1992 season surpassed the season with the most tropical cyclones (1982, 26) and the season with the most named storms (1985, 22). Of these, fourteen reached hurricane strength and eight became major hurricanes—storms that reach Category 3 or higher on the Saffir-Simpson Hurricane Scale.

This season had five storms reach tropical storm intensity or higher in the month of October, the only time that had happened in this basin. In addition, Hurricanes or Tropical Storms Winifred through Zeke are the earliest twenty-first through twenty-fourth named storms in a season in the eastern north Pacific.

The Central Pacific (between 140°W and the International Date Line) saw similarly high levels of activity. Eleven tropical cyclones were tracked by the Central Pacific Hurricane Center throughout the hurricane season. Of those, eight developed in the Eastern Pacific and crossed into the Central Pacific, and three formed within the basin. Two of the storms strengthened to major hurricane status within the Central Pacific's boundaries.

One of the crossover storms, Iniki, crossed into the basin as a tropical depression, strengthened to a Category 4 hurricane, and made landfall in Hawaii, becoming the most destructive hurricane in the state's history.

Systems

Hurricane Ekeka 

The first storm of the season developed from an area of disturbed weather near Kiritimati in the Line Islands. The tropical disturbance had been tracked since January 23, and at 0600 UTC January 28, the Central Pacific Hurricane Center designated the system as Tropical Depression One-C. This was unusual, since the system was located well to the south of the area of normal tropical cyclone formation, further south than any other Pacific hurricane at the time, and the formation occurred well outside the climatological bounds of the hurricane season. The system intensified and reached tropical storm status 12 hours later, at which point it became known as Ekeka.

However, unfavorable wind shear began taking a toll on the storm, causing it to rapidly weaken. Ekeka crossed the International Date Line as a weakened tropical storm, and shortly thereafter degraded to tropical depression status.

Tropical Storm Hali 

In late March, meteorological conditions similar to what allowed Ekeka to develop persisted in the central Pacific. An area of convection organized into Tropical Depression Two-C, just north of 5˚N, atypically close to the equator, and far to the southwest of Hawaii. Moving west-northwestward, it slowly intensified, intensifying into a tropical storm on March 29. Upon doing so, the CPHC gave it the name Hali. Hali was downgraded to a tropical depression on March 30, and it dissipated shortly thereafter. It never affected land. Hali is notable as being the only known Pacific tropical cyclone east of the dateline to develop in the month of March.

Tropical Storm Agatha 

On May 26, a tropical wave moved off the Central America, which began to show signs of organization on May 29. Based on a combination of ship data and Dvorak intensity estimates, the system was upgraded into Tropical Storm Agatha on June 2. Agatha steered toward the north while steadily intensifying. The center of the storm promptly became less defined on June 3, simultaneously recurving to the west. By 0600 UTC June 5, the storm was downgraded back into tropical depression status prior to dissipating the next day.

Agatha approached close enough to the coast of Mexico that watches and warnings were issued. An estimated 1,500 people were evacuated due to the storms' approach.

Tropical Storm Blas 

A tropical wave crossed Central America from June 14–16. The system entered the Eastern Pacific basin without much convection. The northward portion of the wave developed a circulation in the mid-levels of the atmosphere, and despite moving over waters marginally suitable for cyclogenesis, the tropical wave organized into the fourth depression of the season on June 22 as deep convection developed near the center. Early on June 23, the depression intensified into Tropical Storm Blas. Water vapor imagery also suggested that strong wind shear would introduce a weakening trend, and later that day, Blas weakened accordingly back into a depression, and dissipated at 0:00 UTC June 24.

Hurricane Celia 

Celia formed from tropical wave that crossed over into the East Pacific basin around June 19. Dvorak Classifications were initiated on June 21, and a circulation developed the next day. Upon becoming a tropical cyclone the storm formed further east than most Pacific hurricanes due to little wind shear and warm sea surface temperatures near Central America. Due to these conditions, meteorologists at the NHC were anticipating steady intensification. Although the storm initially appeared ragged on weather satellite imagery, the storm intensified into Tropical Storm Celia on 18:00 UTC June 23 as banding features improved. The storm was also forecast to become a moderate Category 2 hurricane on the Saffir-Simpson Hurricane Scale.

Several hours later, Celia was upgraded into a hurricane based on intensity estimates via Dvorak Technique. Celia's rate of intensification accelerated and thus underwent a period of rapid deepening. Overnight, the storm developed an excellent upper-level outflow and very cold cloud tops. Late on June 25, an eye appeared, and the NHC classified the storm as a strong Category 1 hurricane. By midday June 26, Celia intensified into a Category 2 hurricane A well-defined eye soon developed, and the storm was upgraded into a Category 3 hurricane later that day. Celia maintained Category 4 intensity for about 24 hours and then started to gradually weaken.

Late on June 28, Celia's eye became somewhat ragged, and the storm fluctuated in intensity over the next several days. The system briefly re-intensified into a moderate Category 2 hurricane, but later resumed the weakening trend. Celia fell below hurricane status on 00:00 UTC July 2. Turing northwest, the tropical cyclone weakened back to tropical depression status the next day. Thereafter, Celia degenerated into a tight low to mid-level swirl of low-convection clouds that dissipated July 4.

Hurricane Darby 

A tropical wave organized into Tropical Depression Five-E on July 2. It strengthened and was named Darby the next day. Due to very strong steering currents, Darby accelerated as it paralleled the coast of Mexico, and the system strengthened into a hurricane on July 5 while also substantially increasing in size. Darby peaked as a strong Category 3 on July 6, before it began to steadily weaken thereafter as it passed over cooler waters. The hurricane weakened into a tropical storm on July 8 and to a depression the next day. Tropical Depression Darby lost all tropical characteristics on July 10, but moisture from Darby's remnants eventually spread over parts of the continental United States.

During Darby's formation, flooding from the cyclone's rainbands killed three people in Acapulco, where 180 shops were damaged. Four fishermen were reported missing, fate unknown. Manzanillo, Colima, reported sustained winds just above tropical-storm force. The hurricane's remnants brought mainly light rain to the U.S. state of California. Cloud cover also delayed the landing of the Space Shuttle Columbia for one day. A monetary value for damage is not available. Darby also caused a few shipping accidents. A pleasure craft, the Oasis, had an engine failure and was abandoned. The seven people aboard were rescued, but the boat was sunk. A smaller sailboat, the Hosanna, had difficulties but was towed to a safe location by a cutter from the United States Coast Guard. A fishing boat at an unspecified location also experienced difficulties.

Hurricane Estelle 

The origins of Hurricane Estelle were from a tropical wave that began on June 23 off the African coast. Eighteen hours later, the depression strengthened into Tropical Storm Estelle as banding features increased. Gradually intensifying, the storm's outflow improved, and a burst of deep convection occurred over the center. Early on July 10, an eye developed, and based on this, Estelle was upgraded into a hurricane. Around that time, Estelle turned to the northwest.

Although the eye briefly disappeared from satellite imagery later that day, a small and distinct eye quickly re-formed within very deep convection, and Estelle was respectively upgraded into a Category 2 hurricane. Later on July 11, the NHC reported that Estelle had intensified into a major hurricane. A few hours later, Estelle was upgraded into a Category 4 system as the storm continued to rapidly deepen. Moving northwestward due to interaction with a trough, Estelle began a weakening trend. By the afternoon, Estelle was downgraded into a Category 3 system. At 0000 UTC, winds fell below major hurricane force, only to re-intensify back to a major hurricane hours later. However, the next day the thunderstorms around the eye began to warm. The storm gradually weakened over the next few days as it encountered cooler waters. By early on July 14, Hurricane Estelle was re-classified as a Category 3 hurricane, and shortly afterwards, winds fell below major hurricane strength several hundred miles west of the Baja California Peninsula. Turning west under shallow low-level steering currents, Estelle weakened into a tropical storm on July 15. It weakened into a tropical storm the next day.

Hurricane Frank 

The origins of Hurricane Frank were from a tropical wave that exited the coast of Africa on July 1. After reaching the Pacific, it developed an area of disturbed weather on July 9 off the southern Mexican coast. The depression intensified with favorable water temperatures and well-defined outflow. Based on estimates from satellite imagery, the depression intensified into Tropical Storm Frank on July 14. For about a day, the storm tracked generally northwestward before turning to the west due to a building ridge north of the system. An eye developed within the Central Dense Overcast, a large mass of deep convection, late on July 14. Additional intensification was expected, and Frank was predicted to become a major hurricane within 48 hours. The next day, Frank attained hurricane status.

Slow intensification continued, and Frank intensified into a major hurricane, or a Category 3 on the Saffir-Simpson Hurricane Scale, on July 17. By that time, the eye had become well-defined, and later became surrounded by a ring of deep convection. On July 18, Frank reached its peak intensity of  well to the west-southwest of the Baja California peninsula. By July 20, winds dropped below major hurricane intensity, and by the evening, Frank was just a Category 1 hurricane.

Afterward, the hurricane turned northwestward over progressively cooler water temperatures, resulting in weakening. On July 21 Frank was downgraded to a tropical storm, after wind shear caused further weakening. Rapidly declining in strength, it weakened to a tropical depression on July 23.

Hurricane Georgette 

A tropical wave left Africa in early July and crossed the Atlantic without development. It crossed into the eastern Pacific on July 13, and organized into Tropical Depression Eight-E on July 14. The system was located over warm waters, and moving west-northwest, the depression paralleled the coast of Mexico and strengthened into Tropical Storm Georgette on July 15. About 18 hours later, Georgette became a minimal hurricane after deep convection developed over the center. During its formative stages, Georgette brought higher than average humidity to California. The hurricane turned westward due to a ridge to the north, but a west-northwest track later resumed.

Shortly after its peak, the eye became less defined, only intermittently seen on satellite imagery. After wind shear increased, Georgette weakened for about two days, and on July 20 a ridge forced the hurricane southwestward. Similar to hurricanes Celia and Estelle earlier this season, Georgette re-intensified once it turned back toward the west and it regained its peak intensity as a Category 2 hurricane on July 21. Although meteorologists predicted the storm to intensify into a major hurricane, this did not occur. Strong upper-level winds weakened Georgette back to a tropical storm early on July 23. About 30 hours later, it weakened to a tropical depression, devoid of deep convection, and shortly thereafter entered the Central Pacific Hurricane Center's area of responsibility. Moving quickly westward, Georgette had difficulty maintaining a closed atmospheric circulation, and it dissipated late on July 26. Several large waterspouts were sighted early on July 26 off of a beach in the south Kohala district. Georgette's remnants later produced squally weather at Johnston Atoll. The remnants moved across the International Dateline into the western Pacific on July 29, and was still a weak tropical disturbance when it moved past Wake Island at the end of the month.

Tropical Storm Howard 

On July 26 a tropical depression formed and became a weak tropical storm the next day. It steadily organized, ad reached it peak intensity as a strong tropical storm. It then began to weaken, despite being located over warm waters. Howard dissipated several days later without affecting land.

Tropical Storm Isis 

Isis formed on July 28 as a depression and became a tropical storm the next day. Isis peaked as a strong tropical storm with  winds on July 30. Due to cooler water, it weakened to a depression on the first and dissipated the next day. Isis degenerated to a broad area of low pressure on August 2.

Hurricane Javier 

Hurricane Javier probably originated from a tropical wave that left Africa on July 17. While it showed some signs of organization off the west coast of Africa, most of the convection dissipated by time it was near the Lesser Antilles. Around the time it entered the Pacific on July 27, thunderstorm activity increased and became more concentrated. By July 30, the cloud pattern began to organize, though it was initially elongated. Moving westward, the system was declared a tropical depression on 1800 UTC July 30.

Initially, the depression developed slowly and there was even uncertainty on whether it had an atmospheric circulation or not. It was not until 1200 UTC August 2 when the system was finally upgraded into a tropical storm. Around this time, Javier turned west-northwest, a direction it would maintain for days when a ridge north of the cyclone caused it turn to the west, and later, west-southwest. Shortly after turning west, Javier intensified into a hurricane.

After hanging on to hurricane strength for a day, Javier rapidly lost deep convection and become much less organized. By August 7, winds were only . However, the weakening rate slowed somewhat once Javier before it moved CPhC's AOR on August 8. Tropical Storm Javier continued to diminish in strength while moving west-southwest. On August 9, the CHPC reported that Javier had weakened into a tropical depression. By 0000 UTC August 12, Javier had dissipated south of Hawaii. As a dissipating tropical depression, some rainfall and showers were recorded along the Hawaiian islands.

Tropical Depression Twelve-E 

It formed on August 10, and dissipated on August 13.

Tropical Storm Kay 

A depression formed on August 18. It became a tropical storm shortly after forming and was named Kay. Kay was a short lived system. Its peak intensity was only . However, Kay was a very small tropical storm. It dissipated on August 22. Kay never impacted land.

Hurricane Lester 

Tropical Depression Fourteen-E formed on August 20 from a tropical wave that began to show signs of organized on August 19. The depression slowly strengthened and steadily organized attained tropical storm status late on August 20. The next day, Lester turned to the north. After passing through the northern Gulf of California, it made a second landfall in the state of Sonora as a tropical storm. Lester entered Arizona as a tropical storm on August 24, the first time since 1967 that a Pacific hurricane entered the United States as a tropical storm. The low-level circulation subsequently dissipated over New Mexico, though the remnants transitioned into an extratropical cyclone, and subsequently merged with the remnants of Hurricane Andrew and another frontal system on August 29.

Hurricane Lester produced heavy rainfall across its path with a peak rainfall occurring in Mulege. Extensive flood damage was reported west of Hermosillo. A large highway was damaged and many communities were destroyed. Flash flooding from Lester caused 10,000 people to be evacuated from their homes. In addition, mudslides killed three people, and left 5,000 homeless. The remnants of Lester produced heavy rainfall across the Southwestern United States causing flash flooding of arroyos and  moderate flooding in Denver. Snowfall from the storm generated traffic problems in mountainous areas. The remnants of Lester extended through the eastern United States, resulting in rainfall records in Minnesota, Nebraska, Colorado, and North Dakota. In all, Hurricane Lester resulted in $3 million (1992 USD) in damage.

Tropical Storm Madeline 

Far in the open ocean, a tropical wave organized into Tropical Depression Fifteen-E on August 27. Banding and convection increased, and the depression became a tropical storm the next day. As the system progressed westward, it entered a region of strong wind shear and had dissipated on August 31. The system never came near land.

Tropical Storm Newton 

Newton was a fairly short-lived storm. It formed from a tropical wave on August 27. It became a tropical storm, was named Newton 18 hours later, and dissipated four days later on August 31. Newton never impacted any land.

Hurricane Orlene 

Tropical Depression Seventeen-E formed September 2, rapidly intensifying to a tropical storm the next day, then a Category 1 hurricane late that day. Orlene peaked at Category 4 major hurricane status on September 6. The system held intensity for a day or so, with gradual weakening due to shear over the area, but the shear relaxed over the cyclone early on September 9, which brought about a quick restrengthening phase on September 9, although it stopped, and the weakening trend resumed later that day. Orlene downgraded back to a tropical storm on September 10, and finally a depression on September 12, around the same time that it moved into the Central Pacific. It dissipated two days later, on September 14, after making landfall as a tropical depression on the Big Island of Hawaii.

Hurricane Iniki 

Having been designated in the Central Pacific, the storm was given the name Iniki. The subtropical ridge, which typically keeps hurricanes well away from the Hawaiian Islands, weakened due to an approaching upper level-trough and allowed Iniki to turn to the northwest. With very favorable upper-level outflow and warm water temperatures, Iniki steadily intensified, and attained major hurricane status on September 10 while south-southwest of the island chain. It continued rapidly to the north-northeast, and made landfall as a Category 4 hurricane on the Saffir-Simpson Hurricane Scale.

After crossing the island, Iniki weakened rapidly, and became extratropical on September 13 about halfway between Alaska and Hawaii. The Central Pacific Hurricane Center (CPHC) failed to issue tropical cyclone warnings and watches for the hurricane well in advance as the CPHC forecast Iniki to remain well south of the island chain until September 10, less than 24 hours before landfall that any warning was given to the public. Iniki's large wind field caused nearly 30,000 people to evacuate to 110 public shelters in Oahu.

Hurricane Iniki's high winds caused extensive damage in Kauai. 1,421 houses were completely destroyed, and 63 were lost from the storm surge and wave action. A total of 5,152 homes were severely damaged, while 7,178 received minor damage. Iniki's high winds also downed 26.5% of the island's transmission poles, 37% of its distribution poles, and 35% of its  distribution wire system. Some areas were without power for up to three months after the storm. More than 7,000 people were homeless after the storm's passage. One person died when struck by debris, while another died when a portion of her house fell on her. Offshore, two humans died when their boat capsized. More than 100 injuries can be attributed to Iniki.

Prolonged periods of high waves severely eroded and damaged the southwestern coast of Oahu. In all, Hurricane Iniki caused several million dollars in property damage, and two deaths on Oahu. Overall, Iniki was the costliest hurricane to strike the state of Hawaii, causing $3.1 billion in damage. In all, Iniki also was responsible for 6 deaths. During the aftermath of the storm, communities held parties to necessarily consume perishable food from unpowered refrigerators and freezers. Kauai citizens remained hopeful for monetary aid from the government or insurance companies, though after six months they felt annoyed with the lack of help. though military effectively provided aid for their immediate needs. Amateur radio proved to be helpful during the three weeks after the storm, with volunteers coming from around the Pacific to assist in the recovery. Local operators assisted with the American Red Cross to provide disaster relief centers across Kauai. Many insurance companies left Hawaii after the storm, forcing Hawaii to launch a Hurricane Relief Fund in 1993 to help unprotected Hawaii residents, but it was stopped in 2000.

Hurricane Paine 

The tropical wave from which Paine originated moved off the coast of Africa on August 25, reaching the Caribbean on September 2, and eventually crossed Central America and the Yucatán Peninsula. The wave finally reached the Pacific on September 8, developing a mid-level circulation a short distance south of Manzanillo. The circulation finally organized enough to be classified as Tropical Depression Nineteen-E early on September 11, a couple hundred miles southwest of Baja California. The depression continued just south of due west for the next couple of days, under the influence of a deep-layer-mean anticyclone. The depression soon intensified into Tropical Storm Paine around 1800 UTC on the September 11. Gradually intensifying, the storm approached hurricane intensity early on September 13. Upon the formation of an eye, Paine attained hurricane status.

Paine then slowed to a forward speed of only , while executing a slow, erratic clockwise loop for the next three days. The loop was initially caused by an approaching trough, but was later caused by Paine's proximity to the approaching Hurricane Roslyn from the east. By 1800 UTC September 14, Paine weakened back to a tropical storm. By September 16, Paine had dissipated. The remnants of Hurricane Paine were later absorbed into Roslyn's larger circulation.

Hurricane Roslyn 

Despite initial disorganization, the system developed an eye-like feature the next day and was named Tropical Storm Roslyn, the storm also began to develop banding features, concurrent with the better establishment of upper-level outflow. Roslyn quickly intensified to just below hurricane status on the September 15, but began a short weakening trend, as it passed through the wake of Hurricane Paine, where it had begun intensifying on the 11th. By 1800 UTC that day, Roslyn began interacting with the weakening and nearby Paine, with centers of both systems being only a few hundred miles apart, and with this interaction, Paine was absorbed into Roslyn the next day, although this merger didn't affect Roslyn's intensity in the least. On the September 18, Roslyn had a brief period of strengthening. By September 21, deep convection began to rapidly increase, followed by a visible eye on satellite imagery the next day, which indicated that Roslyn had reached hurricane intensity. The hurricane peaked at moderate Category 2 status later on the September 22, with a quick decrease in strength thereafter. Roslyn was downgraded to a tropical storm just as it crossed into the Central Pacific two days later, and over the next several days, a trough to the west turned the weakening Roslyn to the northeast, and then to the north. The system finally dissipated on September 30, over two weeks after it formed.

Hurricane Seymour 

On September 17, a tropical wave was upgraded into a tropical depression. The next day, the depression strengthened into Tropical Storm Seymour a couple hundred miles south of the southern tip of Baja California, and while continuing on a west-northwest and northwest track, Seymour reached hurricane strength on September 19. However, the system soon weakened to a tropical storm, due to the effects of a trough producing moderate shear, and cooler waters. This was short-lived. The trough soon moved out of the area and was replaced by a ridge, which steered Seymour to the west, and allowed it to regain hurricane status on the September 23, while Seymour had developed a broad and clear eye. However, Seymour only held hurricane intensity for a short period of time, and by that night, it had already weakened back to a tropical storm. After losing a significant amount of deep convection, it weakened to a depression two days later. Tropical Depression Seymour finally dissipated on September 27. Seymour never affected land, and no damage or deaths were reported.

Hurricane Tina 

Tina was the strongest storm of the season and threatened land for a time. It formed from a tropical wave on September 17. It moved glacially towards the west and strengthened into a hurricane. A breakdown in a ridge and to the north and a trough then recurved Tina to the northeast and towards land, still moving slowly and gradually slowing down. The trough broke down and was replaced by a strong ridge. Tina then changed direction again and headed out to sea. Tina then slowly weakened as it turned to the north. The stubborn Tropical Depression Tina dissipated on October 11, shortly after entering the central Pacific. Similar to Hurricane Isabel, Tina displayed annular characteristics.

Due to its erratic track and slow motion, Tina was alive from September 17 to October 11— a span of 24 days. This is the record for the eastern Pacific Ocean, smashing the east/central record of 20 days held by Hurricane Fico in the 1978 season and surpassing Typhoon Rita's west Pacific 1972 record. It was itself surpassed just two years later by Hurricane John.

Hurricane Virgil 

On October 1, a tropical wave organized into Tropical Depression Twenty Three-E, a few hundred miles south of the Mexican coast. Despite weak shearing over the system, it became Tropical Storm Virgil later that day, rapidly intensifying to a hurricane on the October 2, when a distinct and well defined eye appeared on satellite images. Virgil was originally on a slow northwest track, but a mid-upper-level trough turned the hurricane to the north early on October 3. Despite the change in track, the hurricane reached a peak at minimal Category 4 status around the same time that it turned to the north that day. Virgil continued north until early on October 4, when it turned to the northwest and made landfall at high Category 2 strength, halfway between Manzanillo and Lázaro Cárdenas, and after landfall, the system was quickly weakened over the mountainous terrain of Mexico, passing to the north of Manzanillo late on the October 4. Shortly after passing over Manzanillo, it weakened below tropical storm strength, and early on October 5, the weakened Tropical Depression Virgil exited into the Pacific, but no regeneration was expected, as strong westerlies and the weakened state of the system prevented any regeneration, and it dissipated shortly thereafter.

Because Virgil made landfall in a sparsely populated area, damage from storm surge was minimal.

Hurricane Winifred 

An area of disturbed weather developed into Tropical Depression Twenty Four-E a few hundred miles south of Acapulco. The next day, it was upgraded into Tropical Storm Winifred when satellite imagery showed increased convective banding features around the storm's center. Winifred was upgraded to a hurricane on October 8, subsequently an eye appeared on satellite imagery. Hurricane Winifred peaked at Category 3 status the next day, turning to the north-northeast just hours before landfall. Initially, the storm maintained major hurricane intensity; however, the eye had disappeared hours prior to landfall. Based on this, Winifred weakened into a Category 2 hurricane. On October 9, it made landfall just east-southeast of Manzanillo. After moving ashore, Hurricane Winifred rapidly weakened to a depression over the mountainous terrain of Mexico by October 10, while continuing on a northeast track and finally degenerating to a remnant low later that day.

Three people were killed by floods. Damage was concentrated in Colima and Michoacán. High waves flooded portions of Highway 200 between Zihuatenajo, Ixtapa, and Lázaro Cárdenas. Electricity and water systems was knocked out in Colima. About  of farmland were damaged. Total damage in one state was estimated at 16000 pesos (1992 MXP) or $5 million (1992 USD$,   USD). Elsewhere, Winifred forced a temporary closure of the port of Acapulco.

Tropical Storm Xavier 

On October 13, a tropical wave developed a visible low level circulation center, developing into Tropical Depression Twenty Five-E later that day, several hundred miles south of Baja California. On October 17, Xavier dissipated several hundred miles south of the tip of Baja California, the remnants were tracked for several days, until it moved out of range of available satellites. Xavier was only the second tropical system to be named with an 'X' in the eastern Pacific basin, after 1985's Xina. Xavier formed at sea, and therefore, no deaths or damages are associated with it.

Tropical Storm Yolanda 

On October 15 a tropical depression formed from the wave several hundred miles south of Manzanillo, and on October 16, it strengthened into Tropical Storm Yolanda. The storm turned to the northwest later that day, and maintained this track for the rest of its lifespan. Yolanda peaked as a strong tropical storm on October 19, but strong southwesterly shear removed all deep convection within the storm's circulation later that day, although there were several occasional flare-ups of convection for the next 12 hours or so. The storm weakened back to a depression the next day, while steering currents moved the weakening depression's center to the southwest, and then finally the west before dissipating in the Central Pacific on the October 22. Due to the fact that it formed at sea, no deaths or damages are associated with the storm.

Tropical Storm Zeke 

On October 25, a tropical wave organized into Tropical Depression Twenty Seven-E several hundred miles south of Baja California. It became Tropical Storm Zeke the next day, concurrent to developing banding features as well as good upper-level outflow. A mid-upper-level trough approached the west coast of the United States, which induced strong shear over the storm, separating deep convection from the center, and it was downgraded to depression status on October 27. However, the trough also forced Zeke north, then northeast, which resulted in the shear weakening, allowing it to re-develop, and the system was again upgraded to tropical storm status. Zeke reached peak intensity on the October 29, while on course for a potential landfall in Baja California. Despite reaching peak intensity, new westerlies spread over Zeke, which rapidly weakened the system, eventually dissipating on October 30.

Other systems 
Over the next few days the system moved north-westwards, but did not develop any further and dissipated on June 18.

During September 24, a tropical disturbance developed within the trade-wind trough of low pressure, just to the east of the International Dateline. Over the next few days the system gradually developed further as it moved north-westwards, before it was classified as Tropical
Depression 21W by the JTWC during September 26. The system subsequently moved out of the Central Pacific basin and into the Western Pacific, where it was immediately classified as a tropical storm by both the JTWC and the Japan Meteorological Agency and named Ward by the former.

Over the next day atmospheric convection surrounding the systems low level circulation increased, as it moved towards the International Dateline. During October 24, it was classified as Tropical Depression 27W, by the JTWC in coordination with the CPHC because of its proximity to the Western Pacific basin. 27W subsequently gradually intensified further, before it was classified as a tropical storm and named Dan by the JTWC, just after it had moved into the Western Pacific basin.

Over the next few days, the system moved westwards and developed a closed circulation, before it was designated as Tropical Depression 03C by the CPHC during November 21. The system continued to move westwards over the next 24 hours but did not develop any further and dissipated during November 23.

Storm names 
The following names were used for named storms that formed in the Northeast Pacific Ocean in 1992. No eastern Pacific names were retired, so it was used again in the 1998 season. This is the same list used for the 1986 season. Storms were named Seymour, Tina, Virgil, Winifred, Xavier, Yolanda, and Zeke for the first time in 1992. Yolanda and Zeke were the first Y and Z names used in the Pacific basin.

All names on the list were used this year. This is the second time that a Northeastern Pacific hurricane season had exhausted its list. The 1983 season also used every name on its list, but the list only went to the W name at the time. In addition, the 1985 season's list was lengthened while it was going on to prevent exhaustion.

For storms that form in the Central Pacific Hurricane Center's area of responsibility, encompassing the area between 140 degrees west and the International Date Line, all names are used in a series of four rotating lists. The next four names that were slated for use in 1992 are shown below. Three of them - Ekeka, Hali, and Iniki, were used throughout the course of the year. Also, a fourth system, Tropical Storm Ward, unofficially formed in the Central Pacific but received a name from the Western Pacific naming lists.

Retirement 

One name was retired from the Central Pacific list after the 1992 season – Iniki. It was replaced with Iolana. Later, in 2006, a name change for various Central Pacific names took place and a second name, Hali, was removed and replaced by Hene.

Season effects 
This is a table of all the storms that have formed in the 1992 Pacific hurricane season. It includes their duration, names, landfall(s), denoted in parentheses, damages, and death totals. Deaths in parentheses are additional and indirect (an example of an indirect death would be a traffic accident), but were still related to that storm. Damage and deaths include totals while the storm was extratropical, a wave, or a low, and all the damage figures are in 1992 USD.

See also 

 List of Pacific hurricanes
 Pacific hurricane season
 1992 Atlantic hurricane season
 1992 Pacific typhoon season
 1992 North Indian Ocean cyclone season
 South-West Indian Ocean cyclone season: 1991–92, 1992–93
 Australian region cyclone season: 1991–92, 1992–93
 South Pacific cyclone season: 1991–92, 1992–93

References

External links 

 NHC 1992 Pacific hurricane season archive
 Central Pacific Hurricane Center archive

 
Pacific hurricane seasons
Articles which contain graphical timelines